Carlina is an Italian feminine given name that is a diminutive form of Carla and Carlotta. Notable people referred to by this name include the following:

Given name
Carlina Durán Baldera, birthname of Carola Durán (born 1987), Dominican model and beauty queen (Miss Dominican Republic 2012)
Carlina Pereira (c. 1926 – 2011), Cape Verdean politician
Carlina Rivera, American politician
Carlina Renae White (born 1987), American kidnap victim

See also

Carina (name)
Carlena
Carlia
Carlin (name)
Carline
Carling (given name)
Carlini (name)
Carlino (name)
Carmina (disambiguation)
Carolina (name)
Karlina
Carlia S. Westcott

Notes

Italian feminine given names